Chelownah Sar (also known as Chalakasar, Chalānā Sār, Chalāneh Sar, Chalmeh Sarā, Chateh Naz̧ar, Chelneh Sar, Chelownaşar, and Chelow Sar) is a village in Saheli-ye Jokandan Rural District, in the Central District of Talesh County, Gilan Province, Iran. At the 2006 census, its population was 1,294, in 285 families.

Language 
Linguistic composition of the village.

References 

Populated places in Talesh County

Azerbaijani settlements in Gilan Province

Talysh settlements in Gilan Province